Alfred Inselberg (22 October 1936, Athens, Greece – 30 December 2019, Tel Aviv, Israel) was an American-Israeli mathematician and computer scientist based at Tel Aviv University.

Inselberg started his career at the Biological Computer Laboratory based at University of Illinois at Urbana-Champaign. He was part of a cybernetics group working on biomathematics developing mathematical models of the ear, neural networks, and computer models for vision and non-linear analysis, gaining a PhD  in mathematics and physics. During this period he participated in the Symposium on Principles of Self-Organization. He is particularly noted for his work on parallel coordinates
 (||-coords), which he proposed in 1959, for the visualization of multidimensional geometries (as in linear algebra) and multivariate problems.

Early life and education

Inselberg was born in Athens, Greece. Later he attended Whittingehame College in Brighton, England. He attended the University of Illinois at Urbana-Champaign (UIUC) receiving a B.Sc. in Aeronautical Engineering. Together with Gary van Sant, and two other students under the guidance of Paul Torda, they founded the University of Illinois Rocket Society in 1953; four years prior to Sputnik. Continuing his studies at UIUC he obtained in 1965 a Ph.D. in Applied Mathematics and Physics under the joint guidance of Ray Langebartel and Heinz von Foerster.

Career
Inselberg held senior research positions at IBM where he developed a mathematical model of the ear (cochlea) (Time November 1974) and later collision-avoidance algorithms for air traffic control (3 USA patents). Concurrently he had joint appointments at UCLA, USC, Technion and Ben Gurion University. Since 1995 he has been a professor at the School of Mathematical Sciences of Tel Aviv University. He was elected senior fellow at the San Diego Supercomputing Center in 1996. His textbook on "Parallel Coordinates: Visual Multidimensional Geometry", was published by Springer.

References

Cyberneticists
20th-century American mathematicians
American computer scientists
21st-century American mathematicians
People from Athens
1936 births
2019 deaths
University of Illinois Urbana-Champaign alumni
Academic staff of Tel Aviv University